This is a list of Spanish television related events in 2003.

Events 
 8 April: Telecinco cameraman, José Couso, dies while covering the War of Iraq.
 1 May: Telefónica sells to Grupo Planeta 25% of the shares of Antena 3, which makes him the reference shareholder of the channel.
 16 June: José Manuel Lara Bosch and Maurizio Carlotti are appointed Chairman and CEO, respectively, of Antena 3.
 21 July: The merger of the digital platforms Canal Satélite Digital and Vía Digital gives rise to a single platform in Spain: Digital+.
 23 July: The National Court issues a ruling convicting Televisión Española for violating the fundamental rights to strike and freedom of association during the news coverage of the  general strike of 20 June of 2002.
 29 October: Antena 3 goes public to the  Spanish Stock Exchange.
 15 November: Sergio Jesús García Gil ranks 2nd at the Junior Eurovision Song Contest, hold in en Copenhagen (Denmark).

Debuts

Television shows

Ending this year

Changes of network affiliation

Foreign series debuts in Spain

Deaths 
 1 January - Pepe Palau, host, 76.
 9 February - José María Tasso, actor, 69.
 4 April - José María Escuer, actor, 82.
 8 April - José Couso, cameraman, 38.
 10 April - Chumy Chúmez, comedian, 75.
 2 May - Queta Claver, actress, 73.
 7 July - Antonio Iranzo, actor, 73.
 19 July - Maruchi Fresno, actress, 87.
 23 July - Fernando García Tola, director, writer and host, 62.
 7 November - Juanjo Menéndez, actor, 74.
 2 December - Mayka Vergara, journalist, 54.

See also
2003 in Spain
List of Spanish films of 2003

References 

2003 in Spanish television